Handicapped or handicap may refer to:

In sports and games
Handicapping, various methods of levelling the outcome in a competitive sport or game:
Handicap race (disambiguation)
Handicap (chess)
Handicap (golf)
Handicap (go)
Handicap (sailing)
Handicap (shogi)
Handicapping, various methods of outcome prediction or levelling outcome predictions:
Asian handicap, bookmakers' technique to level odds
Political handicapping, the news process of trying to predict election outcomes, especially rather than focusing on the political issues
"The Handicapped", short story by Larry Niven originally published in 1967 as "Handicap"

Human condition
Disability, an impairment that substantially affects a person's life activities, and may be present at birth or arise later in life
Self-handicapping, a psychological method for preserving self-esteem

Biology
Handicap principle, an evolutionary theory (also known as handicap theory)